Grzebienisko  is a village in the administrative district of Gmina Duszniki, within Szamotuły County, Greater Poland Voivodeship, in west-central Poland.

The village has a population of 716.

References

Grzebienisko